Coradion melanopus, known commonly as the twospot coralfish, is a species of marine ray-finned fish, a butterflyfish in the family Chaetodontidae. It is widespread throughout the tropical waters of the central Indo-Pacific region, from Indonesia to the Philippines. The twospot coralfish is a small size species which attains a maximum size of 15 cm length. It is a cautious species which inhabits sheltered lagoons or exposed outer reefs where it feeds on sponges, espacially along drop offs. It forms pair to breed.

References

External links
http://www.marinespecies.org/aphia.php?p=taxdetails&id=280392
 

melanopus
Fish of the Philippines
Fish of Indonesia
Fish of New Guinea
Fish described in 1831
Taxa named by Georges Cuvier